The Brantford City Council is the governing body of Brantford, Ontario.

The council consists of a mayor and ten councillors, two representing each of five wards. The city council elections are held every four years and the citizens and community members of Brantford vote for their candidates, who are eligible to be confirmed by majority of popular votes.

The first city council of Brantford was inaugurated on June 18, 1877.

2022-2026
Council elected in the October 24, 2022 municipal election

2018-2022
Council elected in the October 22, 2018 municipal election

2014-2018
Council elected in the October 27, 2014 municipal election

2010-2014
Council elected in the 2010 municipal election:

2006-2010
Council elected in the 2006 municipal election:

1877 city council

 Mayor: Dr. James W. Digby
 Alderman George Wilkes
 Alderman Thomas Large
 Alderman Daniel Costello
 Alderman Matthew A. Burns
 Alderman Edward Fisher
 Alderman George Watt
 Alderman Peter M. Keogh
 Alderman W. J. Scarfe
 Alderman George Lindley
 Alderman George Hardy
 Alderman J.J. Hawkins
 Alderman Dennis Hawkins
 Alderman Thomas Elliot

References

External links
 https://web.archive.org/web/20060827221335/http://brantford.ca/content/publishing.nsf/Content/Members%2Bof%2BCouncil

Municipal councils in Ontario
Municipal government of Brantford
Politics of Brantford